Panchla Assembly constituency is an assembly constituency in Howrah district in the Indian state of West Bengal.

Overview
As per orders of the Delimitation Commission, No. 175 Panchla Assembly constituency  (SC) is composed of the following: Panchla community development block and Gobindapur, Islampur, Laskarpur, Polegustia gram panchayats of Jagatballavpur community development block.

Panchla Assembly constituency is part of No. 25 Howrah (Lok Sabha constituency). Panchla was earlier part of Sreerampur (Lok Sabha constituency).

Members of Legislative Assembly

Election results

2016
AITC
Candidate-Gulshan Mallik
Votes-101126
Percentage-52.98
AIFB
Candidate-Doli Roy
Votes-69199
Percentage-36.25
BJP
Candidate-Bhabani Prashad Roy
Votes-16060
Percentage-8.42
Independent
Candidate-Shyamal Mondal
Votes-1018
Percentage-0.52
IUC
Ahmed Hossain Middya
Votes-891
Percentage-0.47

2011

 

.# Swing calculated on Congress+Trinamool Congress vote percentages taken together in 2006.

1977-2006
In the 2006 state assembly elections, Doli Roy of Forward Bloc won the Panchla assembly seat defeating her nearest rival Abul Kassem Molla of Trinamool Congress. Contests in most years were multi cornered but only winners and runners are being mentioned. Sailen Mondal of Forward Bloc defeated Sk. Nazrul Islam of Trinamool Congress in 2001. Gulshan Mullick of Congress defeated Sailen Mondal of Forward Bloc in 1996. Sailen Mondal of Forward Bloc defeated Prafulla Santra of Congress in 1991, and Anwar Ali Sheikh of Congress in 1987. Anwar Ali Sheikh of Congress defeated Santosh Kumar Das of Forward Bloc in 1982. Santosh Kumar Das of Forward Bloc defeated Anwar Ali Sheikh of Congress in 1977.

1962-1972
Sk Anwar Ali of Congress won in 1972. Asoke Kumar Ghosh of CPI(M) won in 1971. Kanai Lal Bhattacharya of Forward Bloc won in 1969. A.P.Mukhopadhyay of Congress won in 1967. Apurba Lal Majumdar of Forward Bloc won in 1962. The Panchla seat did not exist prior to that.

References

Assembly constituencies of West Bengal
Politics of Howrah district
1962 establishments in West Bengal
Constituencies established in 1962